The flag of Asturias shows the "Cruz de la Victoria" (Victory Cross) in yellow (PMS 109) over blue (PMS 829).

History
The origin of the flag of Asturias is in 1808, during the Peninsular War. As there was not any Spanish official flag yet, Asturians created the current flag, without any separatist intention in the war against the Napoleon's empire. In its first version, it included the motto Asturias jamás vencida (Asturias never defeated).

Color specifications

Design
According to the tradition, the Victory Cross was carried by Pelagius, first King of Asturias, in the decisive Battle of Covadonga against the Moors in 722. This battle, fought in the mountains of Asturias, was hailed by 19th and 20th century historiography as the start of the Reconquista, the Christian re-conquest of the Iberian peninsula from the Moorish domination. However, there is not any historical evidence about the use of this cross.

In 908 the Asturian King Alfonso III the Great ordered that the original wooden cross, made of oak, be clad in gold and precious stones. Currently, it is kept in the Holy Chamber of the Oviedo Cathedral.

The Greek letters Alpha and Omega hang from its horizontal axis. This is a direct reference to the Book of Revelation (verses 1:8, 21:6, and 22:13)., I am the Alpha and the Omega, the beginning and the end, says the Lord God, who is, and who was, and who is to come, the Almighty.

Variations

See also 
Coat of arms of Asturias

References

External links
Law 4/1990 of December 19, about the flag of the Principality of Asturias
Asturias flag at Vexilologia.org

Flags of Spain
Flag
Flags with crosses
Asturia
Flags introduced in 1990
Flags introduced in 1785